Maruthur Gopalan Chakrapani (13 January 1911 – 17 August 1986), commonly known as Ettan ("elder brother" in Malayalam), was an Indian actor and producer based in the Tamil film industry. He was the elder brother of actor-politician M. G. Ramachandran.

Early life 
Chakrapani was born in Vadavannur, Kingdom of Cochin (now Kerala), on 13 January 1911. His parents, Gopala Menon and Sathyabhama, named him Neelakantan, but this was soon changed to Chakrapani because of his father's religious beliefs. Soon after his birth, the family migrated to Ceylon (now Sri Lanka) where Chakrapani's two younger siblings (brother M. G. Ramachandran and a sister) were born. Gopala Menon worked as a magistrate in Kandy, until he suffered an early death. Chakrapani's sister also died while they were in Ceylon.

Sathyabhama took her sons to Kumbakonam to be close to her brother. Chakrapani studied at Yanaiadi School, but left after the seventh grade. His mother then enrolled him and Ramachandran in the Madurai Original Boys Company (MOBC), a professional Tamil theatre company.

Career 
Chakrapani made his Tamil cinema debut in Iru Sahodarargal in 1936. Maya Machhindra and Tamizhariyum Perumal came next, where he began to be known as a character actor. His breakout role came in 1944 with Mahamaya. His character, Neelan, is believed to have been modelled after the Indian philosopher Chanakya. Though Mahamaya was a box office failure, Chakrapani's lines continue to be spoken.His acting in the role of police inspector in Malai kallan and as villain in En Thangai are notable. He had a very good role in Nadodi Mannan . His  big success came some  years later with Thaai Magalukku Kattiya Thaali, where he again played a villain.

Later in his career, Chakrapani transitioned from actor to director and producer, managing his brother's career. Chakrapani worked with his brother on several projects which failed to see the light of day. One such film, Bhavani had Ramachandran in the lead role. It was written by A. K. Velan, directed by Masthan, with Chakrapani producing. Years later, Chakrapani tried again, this time taking the director's seat in the renamed Arasa Kattalai. It was a success.

Personal life and death 
Chakrapani was married to Meenakshi. They had 10 children together: seven sons and three daughters. Chakrapani died on 17 August 1986 at the age of 75.

Filmography

References

External links 

1911 births
1986 deaths
20th-century Indian male actors
Indian male film actors
Male actors in Tamil cinema